Kurt Baker (born 7 October 1988) is a New Zealand rugby union player, who currently plays as a fullback or wing for Old Glory DC in Major League Rugby (MLR).

Between 2008 and 2022, Baker played for the New Zealand Sevens team in 233 World Rugby Sevens Series games and a total of 53 international tourments. In his rugby sevens career, he won 12 World Rugby Sevens Series tournaments, five World Rugby Sevens Series titles (2011, 2012, 2013, 2014, 2020), two gold medals at the Commonwealth Games (2010, 2018), two gold medals and one silver medal at the Rugby World Cup Sevens (2013, 2018, 2022) and a silver medal at the Olympic Games (2020).

Baker has also played for the Māori All Blacks.

Club career

Manawatu
Upon leaving school, Baker was contracted by the Manawatu Rugby Union. In his second year out of school he was a part of 's 2008 national provincial championship squad. He was spotted by coach Dave Rennie and had signed with Manawatu at just 20 years old. Baker made his debut for Manawatu in the 2008 Air New Zealand Cup competition, coming on as a replacement against  in a Ranfurly Shield match. He went on to make his starting debut against , whilst also scoring his first professional rugby union try.

Returning to Manawatu for the 2009 Air New Zealand Cup, Baker scored three tries, the province's second top try scorer of the year along with three fellow players. Baker was also charged with allegedly threatening Johnson.

Highlanders
Baker was signed by the  after an impressive ITM Cup and New Zealand sevens campaign in 2010; he signed a two-year deal with the Otago-based Super Rugby franchise. A stress fracture in his back – which he suffered in Delhi winning gold at the Commonwealth Games – had ruled Baker out of all rugby for three months. Though he was expected to overcome the injury before the 2011 Super Rugby season started, a scan in February showed the fracture had not mended and he was subsequently released by the Highlanders to their wider training group and was then replaced in the Highlanders squad by Kade Poki.

Andre Taylor was Taranaki's preferred fullback throughout 2011, but Baker, who had re-signed with  through until the end of 2012, was recalled by the Highlanders despite lasting just one full game during the shortened ITM Cup season.

He signed with the side for two years after putting aside his sevens career to concentrate on Super Rugby.

Taranaki
In December 2009, Baker decided to move north to  along with Manawatu teammate Andre Taylor, who both signed with the union on a two-year deal. He made his debut for the province starting at fullback against  in round one of the 2010 ITM Cup. After being sidelined throughout the 2011 Super Rugby season with a stress fracture in his back, the injury eventually improved and he managed to play several games for Taranaki in their 2011 ITM Cup campaign. Heading into the 2012 ITM Cup, he had scored nine tries in nineteen games for the province.

Baker made an immediate impact with his decisive running and ability to spot a gap for Taranaki in 2012. His ability to put a player into space also caught the eye. He finished the year as the first-choice fullback. At the end of the 2013 ITM Cup season, Baker was nominated for the Taranaki Sportsman of the Year award after a stand-out season. While he missed out on that award, Baker was given the Back of the Year award, Personality of the Year award and Try of the Year award for his superb try against .

After working his way back to fitness, he finally got a start for Taranaki against  in the 2014 ITM Cup, only to suffer an AC joint injury just a few minutes into the game. Baker scored five tries and made a further eleven appearances in 2015.

Zebre
On 18 June 2016, Italian Pro12 club Zebre announced that Baker would join the Italian club for the 2016–17 season. During that season, Baker played 517 minutes in 9 games (starting in 7) for Zebre and scored one try for the club in their game against Glasgow Warriors. Baker did not return to Zebre for the second year of his contract.

Hawke's Bay
The Hawke's Bay Rugby Union announced on 3 August 2020 that Baker would join the  Magpies for the 2020 Mitre 10 Cup season. It proved to be a successful move for Baker.

Old Glory DC

On 9 December 2022, Old Glory DC announced that club had signed Baker for the 2023 Major League Rugby season. He played his first game for his new team on 18 February 2023 against Chicago Hounds and scored a try on debut.

International career

New Zealand Sevens 
Baker was selected in the New Zealand Sevens squad for the opening two rounds of the 2008–09 IRB Sevens World Series in Dubai and George, making his international rugby debut at The Sevens. In 2009, Baker was named in the New Zealand Sevens trial squad, but went on to play in the England, Scotland, Dubai and George Sevens later that year.

In 2010, Baker secured a permanent position in the New Zealand Sevens squad, playing in all six tournaments. In the Hong Kong Sevens, he led the New Zealand team in scoring four tries in their semi-final win over Fiji and two tries in their Cup final loss to Samoa. He was also the top individual try scorer and point scorer of the tournament. Later in 2010, Baker was named in Gordon Tietjens' squad for the Commonwealth Games in Delhi, India. He was a stand-out in the final against Australia, coming on as a replacement and scoring one of the winning tries to ensure the team the gold medal.

Baker was named as a non-travelling reserve for the All Blacks Sevens squad for the 2022 Commonwealth Games in Birmingham. He featured at the Rugby World Cup Sevens in Cape Town. He won a silver medal after his side lost to Fiji in the gold medal final.

Baker announced his retirement from international rugby sevens after the 2022 Dubai Sevens.

Māori All Blacks

Career honours
Taranaki - 2014 ITM Cup Premiership
Hawke's Bay - 2020 Mitre 10 Cup Championship
Highlanders - 2015 Super Rugby
New Zealand 7s - 2013 Rugby World Cup Sevens, 2018 Rugby World Cup Sevens, 2010 Commonwealth Games, 2018 Commonwealth Games

References

External links
 
 
 NZ Rugby History profile
 
 
 

1988 births
Living people
Ngāpuhi people
People educated at Palmerston North Boys' High School
Rugby union players from Palmerston North
New Zealand rugby union players
Māori All Blacks players
Highlanders (rugby union) players
Taranaki rugby union players
Manawatu rugby union players
Hawke's Bay rugby union players
New Zealand male rugby sevens players
Rugby union fullbacks
Rugby union wings
New Zealand international rugby sevens players
Commonwealth Games gold medallists for New Zealand
Commonwealth Games rugby sevens players of New Zealand
Commonwealth Games medallists in rugby sevens
Rugby sevens players at the 2010 Commonwealth Games
Rugby sevens players at the 2018 Commonwealth Games
Rugby sevens players at the 2020 Summer Olympics
Olympic medalists in rugby sevens
Olympic silver medalists for New Zealand
Medalists at the 2020 Summer Olympics
Olympic rugby sevens players of New Zealand
Old Glory DC players
Medallists at the 2010 Commonwealth Games
Medallists at the 2018 Commonwealth Games